Manuel Komroff (September 7, 1890 – 10 December 1974) was an American playwright, screenwriter, novelist, editor and translator. He was born in New York where he began his working life as a journalist. He also spent some time  in Russia during the Russian revolution.

Marco Polo
One of his most successful publications was his edited version of The Travels of Marco Polo, first published in 1926. He not only  added a chapter which was missing in the  William Marsden translation, but also revised parts of the Henry Yule editions.

Works

Novels
The Grace of Lambs (1925, Boni & Liveright)
Juggler's Kiss (1927, Boni & Liveright) 
Coronet (1930, Coward-McCann)
Two Thieves (1931, Coward-McCann)
I, the Tiger (1933, Coward-McCann)
The March of the Hundred (1939, Coward-McCann)
 The Christmas Letter (1941 American Artists Group, N.Y.)
In the Years of Our Lord (1942, Harper & Bros.)
Echo of Evil (1948, Farrar, Straus and Giroux)
Disraeli (1963, Julian Messner)
Talleyrand (1965, Julian Messner)

Non-fiction
Contemporaries of Marco Polo (1928, Boni & Liveright)
The Magic Bow: A Romance of Paganini (1940, Harper & Bros.)
Big City, Little Boy (1953, A. A. Wyn)
Napoleon (1954, J. Messner))
Mozart (1956, Alfred A. Knopf)
Beethoven and the World of Music (1962, Dodd, Mead & Co.)

Portrait
There is a large 48x31" portrait of a 24-year-old, foppish Komroff, dated 1914, by Leon Kroll in the Portland Museum of Art ( Maine). Komroff is standing indoors, 3/4 view (to the knees), dressed to go outside. He is holding a large portfolio of papers in his right hand.

References

External links
 
 
 
 Manuel Komroff papers at Columbia University
 

1890 births
1974 deaths
20th-century American novelists
American male screenwriters
Writers from New York City
Place of death missing
20th-century American dramatists and playwrights
American male novelists
American male dramatists and playwrights
20th-century American male writers
Novelists from New York (state)
Screenwriters from New York (state)
20th-century American screenwriters